Golden Eagle Tiandi Tower A is a supertall skyscraper located in Nanjing, Jiangsu, China. Construction began in 2013 and was completed in 2019.

Gallery

See also
Golden Eagle Tiandi Tower B
List of tallest buildings in China

References

Skyscraper office buildings in Nanjing
Buildings and structures under construction in China
Skyscraper hotels in Nanjing
Skyscrapers in Nanjing